The 2018–19 season was MTK Budapest FC's 117th competitive season, 1st consecutive season in the OTP Bank Liga and 130th year in existence as a football club.

First team squad 

 

Source:

Transfers

Summer

In:

Out:

Source:

Winter

In:

Out:

Source:

Statistics

Appearances and goals
Last updated on 19 May 2019.

|-
|colspan="14"|Youth players:

|-
|colspan="14"|Out to loan:

|-
|colspan="14"|Players no longer at the club:

|}

Top scorers
Includes all competitive matches. The list is sorted by shirt number when total goals are equal.
Last updated on 19 May 2019

Disciplinary record
Includes all competitive matches. Players with 1 card or more included only.

Last updated on 19 May 2019

Overall
{|class="wikitable"
|-
|Games played || 36 (33 OTP Bank Liga and 3 Hungarian Cup)
|-
|Games won || 12 (10 OTP Bank Liga and 2 Hungarian Cup)
|-
|Games drawn || 4 (4 OTP Bank Liga and 0 Hungarian Cup)
|-
|Games lost || 20 (19 OTP Bank Liga and 1 Hungarian Cup)
|-
|Goals scored || 56
|-
|Goals conceded || 58
|-
|Goal difference || −2
|-
|Yellow cards || 84
|-
|Red cards || 2
|-
||Worst discipline ||  József Kanta (8 , 1 )
|-
||Best result || 8–0 (A) v Tállya – Magyar Kupa – 22-09-2018
|-
|rowspan="3"|Worst result || 1–4 (H) v Ferencváros – Nemzeti Bajnokság I – 29-07-2018
|-
| 0–3 (A) v Paks – Nemzeti Bajnokság I – 15-09-2018
|-
| 1–4 (H) v Budapest Honvéd – Nemzeti Bajnokság I – 19-05-2019
|-
||Most appearances ||  István Bognár (34 appearances)
|-
|rowspan="2"|Top scorer ||  Dániel Gera (8 goals)
|-
|  Sándor Torghelle (8 goals)
|-
|Points || 40/108 (37.04%)
|-

Nemzeti Bajnokság I

Matches

League table

Results summary

Results by round

Hungarian Cup

References

External links
 Official Website
 UEFA
 fixtures and results

MTK Budapest FC seasons
MTK Budapest